The 1979 NCAA Division III football season, part of college football in the United States organized by the National Collegiate Athletic Association at the Division III level, began in August 1979, and concluded with the NCAA Division III Football Championship in December 1979 at Garrett-Harrison Stadium in Phenix City, Alabama. The Ithaca Bombers won their first Division III championship, defeating the Wittenberg Tigers by a final score of 14−10 in a re-match of the 1975 championship (won by Wittenberg).

Conference changes and new programs

Conference standings

Conference champions

Postseason
The 1979 NCAA Division III Football Championship playoffs were the seventh annual single-elimination tournament to determine the national champion of men's NCAA Division III college football. The championship game was held at Garrett-Harrison Stadium in Phenix City, Alabama for the seventh consecutive year. Like the previous four championships, eight teams competed in this edition.

Playoff bracket

See also
1979 NCAA Division I-A football season
1979 NCAA Division I-AA football season
1979 NCAA Division II football season
1979 NAIA Division I football season
1979 NAIA Division II football season

References